Fay Helm (April 9, 1909 – September 27, 2003) was an American film actress. Born in Bakersfield, California, she appeared in about 65 films between 1936 and 1946. She is perhaps better known for films like A Child is Born (1939), Phantom Lady (1944), Lady in the Dark (1944) and Sister Kenny (1946).

Early years
Helm was the daughter of Mr. and Mrs. L.G. Helm of Bakersfield, California. Her father was "a widely known oil operator" in Bakersfield. She participated in drama as a student at the University of Oregon and acted in productions at the Portland Civic Theater. She also acted in the Bakersfield Community Theatre. Helm came to Hollywood in 1936 at the age of 22.

Personal life
Helm married attorney Jack Hardy February 15, 1941. Before that, she was married to assistant district attorney Norman Main. She and Main divorced in 1940. She died on September 27, 2003, and was buried October 15, 2003 in the Holy Cross Cemetery Culver City Los Angeles County, California, Section Y, Tier 12, Grave 54.

Film credits

 Fury (1936) - Townswoman (uncredited)
 San Francisco (1936) - Earthquake Survivor (uncredited)
 Under Cover of Night (1937) - Maggie - Janet's Maid (uncredited)
 Song of the City (1937) - Marge
 A Girl with Ideas (1937) - Genevieve (uncredited)
 Merry-Go-Round of 1938 (1937) - Dainty Doris
 Midnight Intruder (1938) - Marion Loring (uncredited)
 Racket Busters (1938) - Mrs. Smith
 I Am the Law (1938) - Mrs. Butler
 Blondie (1938) - Mrs. Fuddle (uncredited)
 Peck's Bad Boy with the Circus (1938) - Mrs. De Cava
 Sergeant Madden (1939) - Nurse (uncredited)
 Dark Victory (1939) - Miss Dodd
 They All Come Out (1939) - Mamie Jacklin (uncredited)
 Our Leading Citizen (1939) - Tonia
 Hollywood Cavalcade (1939) - Nurse (uncredited)
 Blondie Brings Up Baby (1939) - Mrs. Fuddle
 A Child Is Born (1939) - The Woman
 The Light That Failed (1939) - Red-Haired Girl (uncredited)
 Abe Lincoln in Illinois (1940) - Mrs. Seth Gale (uncredited)
 Parole Fixer (1940) - Rita Mattison
 Blondie on a Budget (1940) - Mrs. Fuddle
 Little Orvie (1940) - Mrs. Balliser
 Women Without Names (1940) - Millie
 Dr. Kildare's Strange Case (1940) - Mrs. Henry Adams
 Untamed (1940) - Miss Olcott
 Blondie Has Servant Trouble (1940) - Mrs. Fuddle
 Dancing on a Dime (1940) - Miss Greenfield
 Life with Henry (1940) - Office Secretary (uncredited)
 Kitty Foyle (1940) - Prim Girl (uncredited)
 Ride, Kelly, Ride (1941) - Nurse (uncredited)
 The Wagons Roll at Night (1941) - Wife (uncredited)
 Million Dollar Baby (1941) - Mrs. Grayson
 The Hard-Boiled Canary (1941) - Miss Wilson
 Blossoms in the Dust (1941) - Leta Eldredge (adopting Tony) (uncredited)
 Two in a Taxi (1941) - Ethel
 The Wolf Man (1941) - Jenny
 Wings for the Eagle (1942) - Miss Baxter
 Give Out, Sisters (1942) - Susan Waverly
 Halfway to Shanghai (1942) - Marion Mills
 Night Monster (1942) - Margaret Ingston
 Life Begins at Eight-Thirty (1942) - Ruthie (uncredited)
 The Crystal Ball (1943) - Brad Cavanaugh's Secretary (uncredited)
 Young and Willing (1943) - Miss Harris (uncredited)
 Captive Wild Woman (1943) - Nurse Strand
 Hers to Hold (1943) - Hannah Gordon
 Honeymoon Lodge (1943) - Mrs. Mary Thomas (uncredited)
 Calling Dr. Death (1943) - Mrs. Duval
 Moonlight in Vermont (1943) - Lucy Meadows
 Phantom Lady (1944) - Ann Terry
 Ladies Courageous (1944) - WAVE (uncredited)
 Lady in the Dark (1944) - Miss Bowers
 Mademoiselle Fifi (1944) - The Manufacturer's Wife
 One Body Too Many (1944) - Estelle Hopkins
 A Song to Remember (1945) - Madame Chopin (uncredited)
 Son of Lassie (1945) - Joanna
 The Falcon in San Francisco (1945) - Doreen Temple
 Dangerous Intruder (1945) - Millicent
 Sister Kenny (1946) - Mrs. McIntyre
 The Locket (1946) - Mrs. Bonner
 That Brennan Girl (1946) - Helen, Ziggy's Neighbor (final film role)

References

External links
 
 Biographical page with photographs , filmdope.com; accessed March 24, 2015.
, Find A Grave
 More biographical details

1909 births
2003 deaths
American film actresses
American stage actresses
Actresses from Bakersfield, California
Place of death missing
20th-century American actresses
Burials at Holy Cross Cemetery, Culver City
University of Oregon alumni
21st-century American women